The 1965 Allan Cup was the Canadian senior ice hockey championship for the 1964–65 senior "A" season.  The event was hosted by the Sherbrooke Beavers and Sherbrooke, Quebec. The 1965 playoff marked the 57th time that the Allan Cup has been awarded.

Teams
Sherbrooke Beavers (Eastern Canadian Champions)
Nelson Maple Leafs (Western Canadian Champions)

Playdowns

Allan Cup Best-of-Seven Series
Sherbrooke Beavers 7 - Nelson Maple Leafs 3
Sherbrooke Beavers 4 - Nelson Maple Leafs 1
Sherbrooke Beavers 9 - Nelson Maple Leafs 2
Sherbrooke Beavers 8 - Nelson Maple Leafs 4

Eastern Playdowns
Quarter-final
Sherbrooke Beavers defeated New Glasgow Rangers 3-games-to-1
New Glasgow Rangers 4 - Sherbrooke Beavers 2
Sherbrooke Beavers 8 - New Glasgow Rangers 0
Sherbrooke Beavers 15 - New Glasgow Rangers 4
Sherbrooke Beavers 8 - New Glasgow Rangers 1
Semi-final
Woodstock Athletics defeated Rouyn-Noranda Alouettes 4-games-to-none
Woodstock Athletics 9 - Rouyn-Noranda Alouettes 3
Woodstock Athletics 7 - Rouyn-Noranda Alouettes 4
Woodstock Athletics 7 - Rouyn-Noranda Alouettes 6
Woodstock Athletics 8 - Rouyn-Noranda Alouettes 5
Sherbrooke Beavers defeated Kingston Aces 3-games-to-none
Sherbrooke Beavers 9 - Kingston Aces 4
Sherbrooke Beavers 5 - Kingston Aces 1
Sherbrooke Beavers 10 - Kingston Aces 5
Final
Sherbrooke Beavers defeated Woodstock Athletics 4-games-to-none
Sherbrooke Beavers 5 - Woodstock Athletics 2
Sherbrooke Beavers 4 - Woodstock Athletics 1
Sherbrooke Beavers 6 - Woodstock Athletics 0
Sherbrooke Beavers 5 - Woodstock Athletics 2

Western Playdowns
Quarter-final
Nelson Maple Leafs defeated Drumheller Miners 3-games-to-1
Nelson Maple Leafs 3 - Drumheller Miners 0
Nelson Maple Leafs 6 - Drumheller Miners 3
Drumheller Miners 3 - Nelson Maple Leafs 1 
Nelson Maple Leafs 3 - Drumheller Miners 0 
Semi-final
Nelson Maple Leafs defeated Moose Jaw Pla-Mors 3-games-to-1
Nelson Maple Leafs 7 - Moose Jaw Pla-Mors 1
Nelson Maple Leafs 9 - Moose Jaw Pla-Mors 2
Moose Jaw Pla-Mors 5 - Nelson Maple Leafs 3
Nelson Maple Leafs 7 - Moose Jaw Pla-Mors 5
Warroad Lakers defeated Transcona Lions 3-games-to-1
Warroad Lakers 5 - Transcona Lions 1
Warroad Lakers 7 - Transcona Lions 1
Warroad Lakers 9 - Transcona Lions 2
Final
Nelson Maple Leafs defeated Warroad Lakers 3-games-to-1
Nelson Maple Leafs 6 - Warroad Lakers 2
Nelson Maple Leafs 6 - Warroad Lakers 3
Warroad Lakers 3 - Nelson Maple Leafs 2
Nelson Maple Leafs 6 - Warroad Lakers 3

External links
Allan Cup archives 
Allan Cup website

Allan Cup
Sport in Sherbrooke
Allan